Caousou School, Toulouse is a private Catholic primary and secondary school, located in Toulouse, France. Founded by the Society of Jesus in 1874, the co-educational school is under government contract to deliver education from primary through post-baccalaureate.

In 2017, Caousou School was 2nd out of 37 in their department in terms of quality of teaching, and 55th out of 2,277 nationally.

See also

 Catholic Church in France
 Education in France
 List of Jesuit schools

References

Jesuit secondary schools in France
Educational institutions established in 1874
1874 establishments in France
Education in Toulouse